The Textron TAPV (Tactical Armoured Patrol Vehicle) is an armoured car currently in use by the Canadian Army. It is essentially a heavier armoured upgrade of the M1117 Armoured Security Vehicle, developed for use by the military police of the US Armed Forces.

Operational history

One Textron TAPV demonstration vehicle was built in 2011.  They have yet to see combat. Four pre-production vehicles have been delivered to the Canadian Army and have undergone various trials and training exercises with plans for an additional two to be delivered. First production vehicles were scheduled to be delivered in 2014, however deliveries were set back to begin in 2016 and will be completed in around 2018. The new vehicle will gradually replace the RG-31 Nyala MRAP vehicle and Coyote armoured cars, which are currently in service with the Canadian Army.

Textron Systems Canada Inc., a Textron Inc. company, announced August 19, 2016, the delivery of the first Tactical Armoured Patrol Vehicle (TAPV) to the Canadian Army. The Canadian Army is fielding the first vehicles to the 5th Canadian Division Support Base Gagetown and the 2nd Canadian Division Support Base Valcartier.

Textron Systems plans to deliver at least 30 vehicles per month to the Canadian Army with all 500 vehicles scheduled to be delivered by December 2017. If any of the 100 options are converted to orders, their delivery is expected by 2020. The fleet will be distributed across seven bases.

The first operational exposure for the TAPV fleet was in early May 2017 when a task force from 2nd Canadian Division from Canadian Forces Base Valcartier deployed on Operation LENTUS to assist flooded communities in Quebec.  The TAPV and LAV VI family of armoured vehicles were featured in the media video coverage. Nearly 2,200 military members, deployed to the areas of Saint-Jean-sur-Richelieu, Shawinigan, Laval, Pierrefonds, Rigaud, Oka, and Gatineau in support of civilian authorities when provincial and territorial authorities became overwhelmed by the natural disaster.

Development
The Tactical Armoured Patrol Vehicle (TAPV) program began in 2009, and in 2012 the contract was awarded to Textron Systems, Inc. On August 16, 2016, Textron systems delivered the first Tactical Armoured Patrol Vehicle (TAPV) to the Canadian Army. An eventual 500 vehicles will be purchased, with the option to order an additional 100.

Engine and suspension
The TAPV is powered by a Cummins QSL diesel engine, which provides , allowing the vehicle a maximum speed of 105 km/h (65 mph), and a maximum range of 644 km (400 miles). The vehicle utilizes an independent suspension axle system originally developed by Irish Timoney, and it has a central tire inflation system to prevent flat tires during combat operations.

Armour

The TAPV relies upon composite armour to provide the maximum protection to the vehicles occupants. The armour is stated as being 20% better than the armour on the M1117. The TAPV also has a V-shaped hull, which provides protection against mine and improvised explosive device (IED) blasts. The vehicle also has a high ground clearance, which increases protection from mine and IED blasts. It can withstand up to 10 kg of explosive force directly under its hull, and can resist even 12.7 mm armour-piercing rounds. Each of the seats in the vehicle are blast protected, and the vehicle has vented wheel wells to disperse the energy of an explosion out from the vehicle.

Armament

The TAPV is slated to have a remote weapons system based on the M151 Protector. The weapon system is called the Dual Remote Weapon System, and can mount both a C6 7.62 mm general purpose machine gun and either a HK GMG 40 mm automatic grenade launcher or a M2HB 12.7 mm heavy machine gun. The vehicle also possesses smoke grenade launchers located on the remote weapon system.

Amphibious

The TAPV can handle water (fording) depth up to  but is not built as fully amphibious vehicle.

Operators

 : Canadian Army - 500 in service

See also
"Combat Reconnaissance/Patrol Vehicle" with rear engine:
 BRDM-2
 D-442 FÚG
 ABC-79M
 RBY MK 1
 Fennek

References

External links
 Textron Systems Canada

Armoured personnel carriers of Canada
Armoured cars
Military vehicles introduced in the 2010s
Wheeled armoured personnel carriers